Kampung Jering is a small village located in Chepir, an area at the east state of Kedah, Malaysia. The kampung is famous for her hardworking and friendly occupants for a long time. The village is also famous for the religious teachers of Islam. The residents of the area practise high standard of behaviour and modesty where any flagrant actions and deeds that are done blatantly in public or society would be considered as churlish.

Location 

Kampung Jering is located in Chepir, Sik which is one of the district in Kedah, a northern state of Malaysia. It is definitely located at the east of Kedah which somehow near to the Thailand province of Pattani. The neighbourhood villages are Kampung Jelutong, Kampung Padang, Kampung Chepir and Kampung Radek. Kampung Jering can be reached about 15 minutes from the Sik town.

Origin 
It is believed that the Kampung's name is originated from the word "Jering" which a type of vegetable found in peninsular Malaysia. From the old folks story, it is believed that the founder of the village had found a very tall plant of Jering in the village. He suddenly came to idea to name the village with the name Kampung Jering which means Jering village in Malay.

Population 

The current facts show that Kampung Jering is occupied by 100% Malay race. In the early era of the village foundation, it is said to be occupied by several Siamese families. It is estimated that the village has about 200 to 300 villagers for the time being and still rapidly growing. Recent data shows that large number of young residents are moving out and migrating to the urban areas such as Penang, Sungai Petani and Kuala Lumpur. The majority of the current population consisted of a significant number of the elderly.

Language 
Malay Language is the main language of the villagers. However some can comprehend Arabic especially the religious teachers. English is not widely used in the village even though is a large number of people in the village be able to understand the language. Kampung Jering has a special trait in terms of language, it has a distinguished Malay dialect from the other parts of the state. At large, the accent is almost similar to the kelantanese dialect rather than the Kedahans. It is acceptable, the variations of the dialects found in this village is due to the origin of the people of the village. Most of the villagers are from the Siamese descendant.

Politics 
The villagers are very active in politics. More than half of the villagers are registered members of Parti Islam Semalaysia (PAS) which is one of the main party in People's Pact. Several political stalwarts in the village play the main role of the party administration of the vicinity. The Islamic party amazing has unified the villagers for a long time. This can be seen through the establishment of some organizations within the village by the party members. Some of the famous ones are the funeral management and wedding pact. The party members will help with their energy and money with the person who involved in such occasion without hoping any compensation or rewards.

Though, there are several active UMNO members in the village. Nevertheless, choosing to be aside from the Islamic party does not mean the villagers are pushed aside, there are still strong connections and relationship between the villagers amid their different ideological parties.

Economy 
The village is famous for its fertile land over centuries. That makes the village is occupied by a large number of farmers. The villagers are now active in agricultural sectors especially in rubber plantations. Besides, the villagers are also keen on planting the fruits and vegetables for their own consumption and business purposes. Progressive development of the village can be observed throughout the countryside area

Villages in Kedah